Mona Donaldson (born October, 1901) was an Australian film editor who was active during the 1920s and 1930s.

Biography 
Mona began working for Australasian Films in Sydney when she was a teenager, and two years later took a job at Paramount as a film examiner and booking clerk.

After taking a break from the industry to take care of her sick mother, she got a job as a film editor at Australasian. She did not receive credit on her earliest editing jobs for directors like Alexis Albert, Frank Hurley, and Arthur Shirley. Editing on 1927's For the Term of His Natural Life was originally attributed solely to Katherine Dawn, but it was later revealed that it was Donaldson's work.

She left Australasian in 1928 to work with Lacey Percival, where she'd spend the subsequent 18 years. She also did contract work for Automatic Film Laboratories during this period. She retired from editing after a lengthy illness in 1947, and opened her own millinery shop. She later married Keith Murray, who she had known for years. Her date of death is unknown.

Selected filmography 

 Uncivilised (1937)
 Rangle River (1936)
 Black Cargoes of the South Seas (1928)
 The Grey Glove (1928)
 For the Term of His Natural Life (1927)
 Painted Daughters (1925)
 Pearls and Savages (1921)

References

External links

Australian women film editors
1901 births
Year of death missing
Australian film editors